The Maiden Danced to Death is a 2011 Hungarian-language independent drama film written, starring, directed by Endre Hules. The film is a Hungarian-Slovenian-Canadian co-production filmed on-location in all three countries. It was one of the six films shortlisted for the Hungarian entry for the Best Foreign Language Oscar at the 85th Academy Awards.

Cast

 Endre Hules as Steve Court
 Bea Melkvi as Mari Udvaros
 Deborah Kara Unger as Lynn Court
 Zsolt László as Gyula Udvaros Jr
 Stephen McHattie as Ernie
 Emöke Zsigmond as Gabi
 Gil Bellows as Fred
 István Zámbó as Feri
 Boris Cavazza as Gyula Udvaros Sr.

References

External links
 
 

2011 films
Canadian drama films
2010s English-language films
2010s Hungarian-language films
2011 drama films
Hungarian drama films
Slovenian drama films
2010s Canadian films